David Rhys Remington Stephens (born 8 October 1991) is a British footballer who plays as a defender. Stephens has previously played for Norwich City, Lincoln City and Hibernian. He has represented Wales at youth international levels up to and including the Wales under-21 team.

Club career

Youth team at Norwich City
Born in Welwyn Garden City, Hertfordshire, Stephens joined Norwich City's Academy as a 13-year-old. He was initially preferred in a central midfield role, but is now primarily thought of as a central defender.

Professional career
Stephens signed a professional contract with Norwich in June 2009. His first team debut came on 6 October 2009, as a substitute in a 1–0 win over Gillingham in the Football League Trophy. On 19 March 2010, Stephens joined Football League Two side Lincoln City on loan for the remainder of the 2009–10 season.

Stephens signed for Scottish Premier League team Hibernian on a three-year deal in July 2010. Stephens made his debut for Hibs as a substitute in the opening day 3–2 win at Motherwell on 15 August. He made 29 appearances in just over two years with Hibs.

Stephens left Hibs on 31 August 2012 and signed for Football League Two club Barnet. Stephens played regularly for Barnet, forming several different centre back partnerships throughout the course of the 2012–13 season. Stephens was voted Barnet's Player of the Season by supporters in 2012–13 and again in 2013–14. After promotion in 2014–15, Stephens rejected a new deal at Barnet and left the club on 1 July 2015. In October of that year, Stephens joined Boreham Wood.

International career
Stephens made his debut for the Wales under-17 side on 27 August 2007 in a 2–1 friendly win over Belgium, before scoring his first goal for the side two days later as a substitute during a second 2–1 victory over Belgium. Having established himself in the team, he featured in all three matches of the first qualifying round as well as in two matches of the elite round of qualifying for the 2008 UEFA European Under-17 Football Championship, scoring his second under-17 goal in a 1–1 draw with Slovenia. He made his final appearance at under-17 level on 19 July 2008 in a 1–0 defeat to Sweden.

Three months later, Stephen moved up to the Wales under-19 squad, being handed his debut in a 0–0 draw with Montenegro on 30 September 2008. He was also part of the unsuccessful under-19 squads for the qualifying rounds of both the 2009 and 2010 UEFA European Under-19 Championship, scoring his first goal at under-19 level on 8 November 2009 in a 3–1 win over Macedonia. He made his debut at under-21 level on 10 August 2010 in a 1–1 draw with Malta.

Honours
Barnet
Conference Premier
Champions: 2014–15

Career statistics

References

External links

David Stephens profile at the Football Association of Wales

1989 births
Living people
Sportspeople from Welwyn Garden City
English footballers
Welsh footballers
Wales youth international footballers
Wales under-21 international footballers
Association football defenders
Norwich City F.C. players
Lincoln City F.C. players
Hibernian F.C. players
Barnet F.C. players
Boreham Wood F.C. players
English Football League players
Scottish Premier League players
National League (English football) players